Karnataka Legislative Council is the upper house of the bicameral legislature of Karnataka, India. The Karnataka Legislative Council is a permanent body comprising 75 members.

Term
The Karnataka Legislative Council is a permanent body with one-third of its members retiring every two years. House strength is 75 and the term of members is 6 years (renewable).

Constituencies and Members (75)
Source:

Among the 75 members of the Legislative Council, 25 are elected by the Karnataka Legislative Assembly members, 25 are elected by local authorities, 7 are elected by the Graduates, 7 are elected by the Teachers and 11 members are nominated by the Governor of Karnataka. The following is the list of the current members:

Nominated by the Governor 

 Members of Karnataka Legislative Council nominated by the Governor

Elected by MLAs 

 Members of Karnataka Legislative Council elected by members of the Legislative Assembly

Elected from Local Authorities' constituencies (25)

Elected from Graduates constituencies (7)

Elected from Teachers' constituencies (7)

See also
Karnataka Legislative Council
List of Chief Ministers of Karnataka
List of governors of Karnataka
List of chairmen of the Karnataka Legislative Council

References

External links 
 www.kla.kar.nic.in/council/council.htm (Karnataka Legislative Council)

 
1907 establishments in British India
State upper houses in India